NGC 1705 is a peculiar lenticular galaxy and a blue compact dwarf galaxy (BCD) in the southern constellation of Pictor, positioned less than a degree to the east of Iota Pictoris, and is undergoing a starburst. With an apparent visual magnitude of 12.6 it requires a telescope to observe. It is estimated to be approximately 17 million light-years from the Earth, and is a member of the Dorado Group.

This is a relatively isolated galaxy, with its nearest neighbors being more than  distant. However, its neutral hydrogen disk shows a significant amount of warp, suggesting that the outer gas is still settling into place. The mass models of the galaxy suggest the dominant source of mass is a dark matter halo. It has a super star cluster located near the galactic center, and shows strong galactic winds.

Over the last 10 million years it has added  worth of stars. The younger stars in the galaxy with an age below a billion years have an estimated  and are mainly concentrated near the center, while the older star populations have  and form a more extended distribution.

References

External links

NGC 1705 at ESA/Hubble
 

Lenticular galaxies
Peculiar galaxies
Dorado Group
Pictor (constellation)
1705
16282